An election for Lord Speaker, the presiding officer of the House of Lords, took place on 8 June 2016, with the result announced on 13 June. Incumbent Baroness D'Souza, who was at the end of her first term, announced on 11 February that she would not be standing for re-election.

Election procedure and timetable
Members of the House of Lords who wished to stand for election were required to have a proposer and a seconder. The alternative vote system was used in the election and all members who had taken the oath in the current parliament and were not on leave of absence, disqualified or suspended from the House were eligible to vote.

Timetable was as follows:
Thursday 19 May 2016 (17:00) – Candidate registration deadline
Monday 23 May 2016 – List of candidates published and ballot papers sent to members requesting a postal vote
Wednesday 8 June 2016 – Voting day
Monday 13 June 2016 – Results announced and Queen's approval notified
Thursday 1 September 2016 – New Lord Speaker taking office
Monday 5 September 2016 – New Lord Speaker presiding for the first time

Candidates
The following members of the House were registered as candidates:
The Lord Cormack (Conservative)
The Lord Fowler (Conservative)
The Baroness Garden of Frognal (Liberal Democrat)

Result

References

2016 elections in the United Kingdom
House of Lords
June 2016 events in the United Kingdom
Lord Speaker elections